Toxidia parvulus, the parvula skipper or banded grass-skipper, is a butterfly of the family Hesperiidae. It is found in the Australian Capital Territory, New South Wales, Queensland and Victoria.

The wingspan is about 20 mm.

The larvae feed on Poaceae species. They construct a shelter made from a curled leaf of their host plant. It rests in this shelter during the day. Pupation takes place inside the shelter.

External links
Australian Insects
Australian Faunal Directory

Trapezitinae
Butterflies described in 1884
Butterflies of Australia